Shrimant Rajmata Vijayaraje Scindia Medical College is a full-fledged tertiary Medical college in shivpuri, Madhya Pradesh. It was established in the year 2018. The college imparts the degree of Bachelor of Medicine and Surgery (MBBS). Nursing and para-medical courses are also offered. The college is affiliated to Madhya Pradesh Medical Science University and is recognized by Medical Council of India. The selection to the college is done on the basis of merit through National Eligibility and Entrance Test.

Location
Shivpuri is in the Gwalior division of northwest Madhya Pradesh. It is 121 km from the city of Gwalior.  The medical college is situated on the Agra Bombay Highway.

Admission
The college has an annual intake of 100 candidates for M.B., B.S. (Bachelor's degree in Medicine and Surgery).

Departments
Anatomy
Physiology
Biochemistry
Pharmacology
Pathology
Microbiology
Forensic Medicine
Community Medicine
Ophthalmology
Otolaryngology
Medicine
Surgery
Obstetrics & Gynecology
Pediatrics
Anesthesiology
Radiology
Dermatology
Orthopedics
Psychiatry

Affiliation
The medical college is affiliated  to Madhya Pradesh Medical Science University, Jabalpur  and is attached to District Hospital, Shivpuri

Inauguration
Jyotiraditya Scindia, Member of Parliament, officially inaugurated the Government Medical College, Shivpuri on 5 March 2019.  Dr. Professor Jyoti Bindal is the first dean.

References

External links

Medical colleges in Madhya Pradesh
Shivpuri